New Brunswick station is a railroad station in New Brunswick, New Jersey. It serves Amtrak and NJ Transit trains on the Northeast Corridor. The station is located at the intersection of Easton Avenue and French and Albany Streets, near the College Avenue Campus of Rutgers University.

Service
The station has two high-level side platforms serving the outer tracks of the four-track Northeast Corridor.

NJ Transit's Northeast Corridor Line calls at the station. Most of Amtrak's Northeast Corridor services bypass the station via the inner tracks, except for select Keystone Service and Northeast Regional trains and the weekday westbound Palmetto. Northbound Crescent trains stop in New Brunswick as well.

History

Train service to New Brunswick was begun by the New Jersey Railroad, northbound in 1838 and southbound in 1839. Its successor,  Pennsylvania Railroad, built the current station in 1903 when the tracks were raised above street level. Service was eventually taken over by Penn Central and then Amtrak and New Jersey Transit. In 2005, the Clocker trains, a popular commuter service serving the station, were transferred to NJT. In October 2015 the southbound Palmetto began stopping here.

The depot was designed in the Colonial Revival style and includes walls of light brown brick, hipped roof with gabled dormers and a deep cornice with dentil molding at its base. Brick quoins at the corners of the building convey an impression of strength and solidity. Windows display a popular Georgian Revival pattern of 9-over-1. Sills are incorporated into a stone belt course that wraps around the building, while lintels are embellished with prominent keystones. The design is similar to that of the Chester Transportation Center in Pennsylvania.

The station building was listed on the New Jersey Register of Historic Places and National Register of Historic Places since 1984, and is part of the Operating Passenger Railroad Stations Thematic Resource.

Urban transit hub
In 2005 the station was designated the core of the New Brunswick transit village, a smart growth initiative to promote transit-oriented development which can include government incentives to encourage compact, higher density, mixed-use development within walking distance of the station.

In addition to New Jersey Transit bus operations and Rutgers Campus buses, the station is served by local shuttles known as Brunsquick and DASH. Studies are underway to develop the New Brunswick Bus Rapid Transit system, of which the station would be the hub. NJ 18 and NJ 27, which intersect at the station, would function as the two major corridors for a bus network that would connect downtown, residential neighborhoods, the five campuses of Rutgers in the city and Piscataway, and proximate communities.

New Brunswick is one of nine cities in New Jersey designated as eligible for Urban Transit Hub Tax Credits by the state's Economic Development Authority. Developers who invest a minimum of $50 million within  of a train station are eligible for pro-rated tax credit. The Gateway is one such project located just to the north of station and connected by a new pedestrian bridge, creating a direct link to the Rutgers campus. It is the tallest building in the city and one of several new projects in the vicinity of the station that has led to a revitalization of the city's downtown surrounding it. Another planned building, a 16-story residential tower at Somerset Street located one block north of the station, is the second UTHTC-approved project in the city.

High-speed rail corridor
In August 2011 the United States Department of Transportation obligated $450 million to a six-year project to improve  of the Northeast Corridor between New Brunswick and Trenton.

Renovation and upgrades
In 2019 Amtrak earmarked funds for improvement at the station. NJ Transit allocated $49 million in September 2022 for renovation and upgrades of the station.

See also
 Millstone and New Brunswick Railroad
 List of New Jersey Transit stations

Bibliography

References

External links 

 New Brunswick Amtrak & New Jersey Transit Station (USA RailGuide -- Train Web)
 NJDOT Liberty Corridor project description
 George Street entrance from Google Maps Street View
 Easton Avenue entrance from Google Maps Street View
 Albany Street entrance from Google Maps Street View

NJ Transit Rail Operations stations
Buildings and structures in New Brunswick, New Jersey
Railway stations in the United States opened in 1838
Railway stations in Middlesex County, New Jersey
Stations on the Northeast Corridor
Amtrak stations in New Jersey
National Register of Historic Places in Middlesex County, New Jersey
Railway stations on the National Register of Historic Places in New Jersey
New Jersey Register of Historic Places
Railway stations in New Jersey at university and college campuses
Former Pennsylvania Railroad stations
1838 establishments in New Jersey